Stephen Ayomide "Ayo" Obileye (born 2 September 1994) is an English professional footballer who plays as a defender for Scottish Premiership club Livingston, having previously played for Sheffield Wednesday, Charlton Athletic, Eastleigh, Dover Athletic, Maidenhead United, Ebbsfleet United and Queen of the South.

Early life
Obileye was born in Homerton University Hospital in the London Borough of Hackney to Nigerian parents.

Career
Obileye started his career in the youth system at Leyton Orient, before joining Chelsea as a schoolboy. He stayed with the club until 2011, but failed to earn a scholarship with the club. In 2011, he moved north to sign a two-year scholarship with the academy at Sheffield Wednesday. He made his professional debut at the age of 16 in August 2011, starting in the 0–0 draw with Yorkshire rivals Bradford City at Valley Parade in the EFL Trophy, which Bradford went on to win on penalties. He was made captain of the Development Squad for the 2012–13 season, and was awarded with his first professional contract for the club in May 2013, signing a one-year deal on completion of his scholarship. In March 2014, he was linked with moves away from the club as he wanted to return to his London roots, and spent a short time training with Premier League side Crystal Palace. In May 2014, he left Sheffield Wednesday at the end of his contract having only made one first team appearance, turning down a new deal.

In October 2014, he signed for EFL Championship side Charlton Athletic after impressing on trial, and was placed in the U21 Development Squad. He initially signed on a short-term deal, but in November 2014 his contract was extended until June 2015. Later in the month he signed for Football League Two side Dagenham & Redbridge on a one-month youth loan deal. As part of the loan agreement he was still eligible to play for Charton's U21 Development Squad. He made his debut on the same day, coming on as a substitute for Damian Batt in the 1–0 away defeat to AFC Wimbledon. In December 2014, his loan was extended for a further month, having made four appearances for the Daggers. He continued to have a positive impact in the Daggers back-line and in January 2015 his loan was again extended for a further month. He continued to remain a permanent fixture in the Daggers defence, extending his stay in February 2015 until the end of the season. He returned to Charlton in May 2015, having made 26 appearances for the Daggers, scoring twice.

In August 2015, he returned to Dagenham & Redbridge on loan until January 2016, after a successful loan the previous season.

Obileye had a two-year spell at Eastleigh from 2016 to 2018, scoring 11 goals in 53 games in all competitions. He joined Maidenhead United for the 2018–19 season.

On 4 June 2019, Obileye joined Ebbsfleet United.

On 9 September 2020, Obileye signed for Scottish Championship club Queen of the South on a one-year contract. Despite playing in a defensive role, Obileye scored 9 league goals during the 2020–21 season, finishing second top goalscorer for the Doonhamers behind Connor Shields with 11 goals (8 league and 3 cup) and he was also second top goalscorer alongside three other players in the Scottish Championship, all behind Liam Boyce of Hearts with 14 goals.

On 6 May 2021, Obileye signed a pre-contract agreement with Livingston, agreeing a two-year contract, with a further one-year option. Livingston won the chase from other Scottish Premiership clubs for his signature.

Career statistics

References

External links

1994 births
Living people
People from the London Borough of Hackney
English footballers
Association football defenders
Leyton Orient F.C. players
Chelsea F.C. players
Sheffield Wednesday F.C. players
Charlton Athletic F.C. players
Dagenham & Redbridge F.C. players
Eastleigh F.C. players
Dover Athletic F.C. players
Maidenhead United F.C. players
Ebbsfleet United F.C. players
Queen of the South F.C. players
Livingston F.C. players
English Football League players
National League (English football) players
Scottish Professional Football League players
Black British sportspeople
English people of Nigerian descent
English people of Yoruba descent
Yoruba sportspeople